Ethmia septempunctata is a moth in the family Depressariidae. It is found in Japan, Korea, the Russian Far East and China.

Adults have been recorded from May to mid-July.

References

Moths described in 1882
septempunctata
Moths of Japan